Union School or Old Union School or variations may refer to:

in Haiti
Union School Haiti

in the United States

Old Union School (Birdell, Arkansas), listed on the National Register of Historic Places (NRHP)
Geyserville Union School (Geyserville, California), NRHP-listed 
Union School (West Haven, Connecticut), NRHP-listed
Union School (Filer, Idaho), NRHP-listed
Burns Union School, Burns, Kansas, NRHP-listed
Union Station School (Paducah, Kentucky), NRHP-listed
Union School (Searsport, Maine), NRHP-listed
Douglas Union School, Douglas, Michigan, NRHP-listed
Union School (St. Johns, Michigan), NRHP-listed
Union School (Natchez, Mississippi)
Newton Union Schoolhouse (Camden, New Jersey), NRHP-listed
Union Schoolhouse, Red Bank, New Jersey, NRHP-listed
East Otto Union School, East Otto, New York, NRHP-listed
East Springfield Union School, East Springfield, New York, NRHP-listed  
Old Union School (Chesterville, Ohio), NRHP-listed
Old Union School (Coshocton, Ohio), NRHP-listed
West Union School, Norwich, Ohio, NRHP-listed
Union School (Fort Washington, Pennsylvania), NRHP-listed
Dillingersville Union School and Church, Zionsville, Pennsylvania, NRHP-listed  
First Union School (Crozier, Virginia), NRHP-listed
Second Union School, Goochland, Virginia, NRHP-listed

See also
Union High School (disambiguation)
Union School District (disambiguation)